Brackman or Brackmann is a surname which may refer to:

People
 Albert Brackmann (1871–1952), German historian
 Andrew Brackman (born 1985), American former Major League Baseball pitcher
 Arnold Brackman (1923–1983), American journalist and author
 Barbara Brackman, American quilter and quilt historian
 Constance Brackman (born 2001), Belgian footballer
 Jacob Brackman (born 1943), American journalist, writer, and musical lyricist
 Norbert Brackmann (born 1954), German politician
  (1841–1927), Baltic-German politician
 Robert Brackman (1898–1980), German-American artist

Fictional characters
 Douglas Brackman Jr., a main character in L.A. Law, also his wife Sheila
 Gustaf Brackman, a scientist and political leader in the video game Supreme Commander and its sequels
 Ivan Brackman, a clone of the above in Supreme Commander 2

See also
 House-Brackmann score

Germanic-language surnames
English-language surnames
Jewish surnames